Posorja is a small village in Ecuador that lies about 120 km from the city Guayaquil at the delta of the Guayas River. Posorja lies in a very dry climate zone. Many years ago, the main occupation in Posorja was fishing. However, increasing pollution of the sea and new high-tech fishing methods have drastically lowered the income of the people of Posorja. Three fish processing factories give part-time work to some of the people. Of the 15,000 people in the area, 60% do not have regular employment.

Religion 
93% Roman-Catholic.

Schools / education 
There are 3 types of schools: public (financed by the government), private, and schools financed by charity.

Populated places in Guayas Province